Peter Julian Tammer (born 26 February 1943, in Melbourne) is an Australian film director, and a former Senior Lecturer in the film and television department at Victorian College of the Arts.

Biography
 
Peter Tammer began working in the film industry when he was 19 years old, in 1962. He worked as a film editor for film companies such as Eltham Films, with Tim Burstall, and later for government organisations such as the Commonwealth Film Unit. He started creating his own independent short films in 1964, such as And He Shall Rise Again (1964, 15 mins) and Beethoven and all that Jazz (1964, 2 mins).  Through the 1960s, he connected with other Melbourne independent filmmakers such as Nigel Buesst and Tom Cowan, and Paul Cox.
 
In the early 1970s, Tammer was a founding member of the Melbourne Film-maker's Co-op, an important group for independent filmmakers in Melbourne at the time.  Prior to the formation of the Melbourne Co-op, together with his wife Monique, Tammer put together a very early programme of independent short films called "A Breath of Fresh Air". He was associated with other filmmakers such as Jim Wilson, Fred Harden, Bert Deling, James Clayden, many of whom were now showing films at the Piencotheca Gallery, a precursor to the Melbourne Film Co-op.  He also had a productive association with Garry Patterson in the mid 1970s, for the films Here's To You, Mr. Robinson (1976, 52 mins) and How Willingly You Sing (1977, 90 mins, directed by Patterson, with cinematography by Tammer).
 
Tammer's teaching career began in 1973, when he was appointed a Tutor in a film course at Melbourne State College in Carlton. In 1979, he was appointed Lecturer in Film at the Swinburne Film and Television School (founded in 1966). In 1986, Tammer was appointed Senior Lecturer in Film, and in 1992 the Film and Television School transferred to the Victorian College of the Arts (VCA). At the VCA Tammer moved in 1966 from teaching the Graduate Diploma of Film and Television (Narrative) to deliver the newly created Graduate Diploma of Film and Television Documentary stream.

Tammer was an inspirational teacher for many of the students, and he retired from the VCA in 1998.
 
Tammer continued making his own independent films all through this time, producing a series of award-winning films in the 1980s, including Mallacoota Stampede (1981, 60 mins), Journey to the End of Night (1982, 70 mins), and Hey Marcel ... (1984, 17 mins). A cherished project on the film scholar and actor John Flaus, entitled Flausfilm, was begun in 1988 and finally completed in 2009.
 
Tammer now lives in country Victoria, in Kyneton, and involves himself with music and short story writing.

Filmography
Titles directed by Peter Tammer:

 And He Shall Rise Again (1964, 15 mins, 16mm, Narrative)
 On The Ball (1964, 4 mins, 16mm, Experimental)
 Beethoven and all that Jazz (1964, 2 mins, 16mm, Experimental)
 Pisces Dying (1966, 15 mins, 16mm, Narrative)
 Our Luke (1970, 10 mins, 16mm, Experimental)
 Journey to a Broken Heart (1970, 50 mins, 16mm, Doco)
 Flux (1970, 40 mins, 16mm, Experimental)
 A Woman of our Time (1972, 26 mins, 16mm, Biog. Doco)
 The Curse of Laradjongran (1972, 30 mins, 16mm, Doco)(Co-production With Monique Schwarz)
 Struttin' the Mutton (1975, 17 mins, 16mm, Observational)
 Here's To You, Mr. Robinson (1976, 52 mins, 16mm, Biog. Doco)(Co-Production With Garry Patterson)
 Mallacoota Stampede (1981, 60 mins, 16mm, Narrative)
 Journey to the End of Night (1982, 70 mins, 16mm, Biog. Doco)
 My Belle (1983, 20 mins, 16mm, Portrait)
 Hey Marcel... (1984, 17 mins, 16mm, Experimental)
 Queen of the Night (1985, 20 mins, 35mm, Experimental.)
(note: these three above films are gathered as "Triptych")
 Fear of the Dark (1985, 59 mins, 16mm, Doco/Narrative)
 Hi Jim (1990, 20 mins, S/VHS)
 Flausfilm (99 mins, video) Filmed between 1988 and 1991. Completed in 2009.
 Just the Two of Us (1994, 60 mins, uncompleted)
 Our World Trip (1950/51) (currently in post-production)

Awards

 Best Editing, A.F.I. Awards, 1969 - And Then There was Glass
 "ERWIN RADO" Prize, Melbourne Film Festival 1981 - Mallacoota Stampede
 "TEN AWARD" For Documentary Excellence, Melbourne Film Festival 1982 - Journey to the End of Night
 "JURY PRIZE", A.F.I. Awards, 1982 - Journey to the End of Night
 Finalist Greater Union Awards, Sydney Film Festival - Hey Marcel ...
 Finalist Greater Union Awards, Sydney Film Festival - Queen of the Night
 Finalist, TOKYO Video Festival, "Video-Letter" Competition, Minor Prize - Hi Jim

References

External links 
 Peter Tammer on Melbourne Independent Filmmakers
 The website of Peter Tammer

Living people
Film directors from Melbourne
1943 births